"Take My Heart (You Can Have It If You Want It)" or "Take My Heart" is a 1981 single by Kool & the Gang from their album, Something Special.

Record World said that "James Taylor soothes with a romantic croon and sexy rap while relentless keyboard waves and a sharp rhythm kick provide the backdrop."

Track listing

Charts
The single was the group's sixth number-one R&B single, reaching the top of the U.S. R&B chart for a single week and reached #17 on the Billboard Hot 100.  Along with the tracks, "Get Down On It" and "Steppin' Out", "Take My Heart" went to the top 20 on the US dance charts.

Robert Palmer version
Robert Palmer covered the song titled "You Can Have It (Take My Heart)" on his 1983 album Pride.  His version reached number 66 in the United Kingdom.

References

External links
 

1981 songs
1981 singles
Kool & the Gang songs
Songs written by Claydes Charles Smith
Songs written by James "J.T." Taylor
Songs written by Ronald Bell (musician)
Songs written by Robert "Kool" Bell
Songs written by Eumir Deodato
De-Lite Records singles
Robert Palmer (singer) songs
Island Records singles